Ippolita Maria Sforza (18 April 1445 – 20 August 1488) was an Italian noblewoman, a member of the Sforza family which ruled the Duchy of Milan from 1450 until 1535. She was the first wife of the Duke of Calabria, who later reigned as King Alfonso II of Naples. Ippolita was a very intelligent and cultured young woman.

Life

Childhood 
Ippolita was born on April 18 1445 in Cremona to Francesco Sforza and Bianca Maria Visconti, the only daughter of the Duke of Milan Filippo Maria Visconti. Since she was a child she showed precocity of intellect, love for letters and a certain passion for hunting, favored in this by her father who often gave her greyhounds for their country estates. Francesco Sforza sometimes asked his young daughter to act as an intermediary between him and his mother, so that she could help him to return to the graces of Bianca Maria, the times when he and his wife entered into a quarrel for some reason. 

She had for masters Guiniforte Barzizza, by Baldo Martorelli, humanist from the Marche region heir to the humanist pedagogy of Vittorino da Feltre, and Costantino Lascaris, who gave her the study of Greek and dedicated a Greek Grammarto her. When she was 14 years old she made a Latin address to pope Pius II at the diet of Mantua, which became well known after it was circulated in manuscript.
An alleged portrait of Ippolita was painted Domenico Ghirlandaio. 

Giovanni Sabatino degli Arienti describes it as follows:

Marriage 
On 10 October 1465 she married the Duke of Calabria Alfonso of Aragon, son of King Ferrante of Naples. The latter sent his second son Federico with six hundred horses to Milan to marry Ippolita by proxy in the name of his brother and to accompany her to his new home.

The bride had already left Milan with the wedding procession, when the marriage risked skipping due to the sudden death of the leader Jacopo Piccinino, son-in-law of Francesco Sforza. Ferrante of Aragon in fact had previously lured him to Naples with the false promise of conduct and then for revenge imprisoned, as the leader had fought against him during the first baronial revolt. Jacopo Piccinino died shortly after his arrest, according to Ferrante for having fallen from the window following a failed escape attempt, but according to most he was strangled in prison by order of the sovereign. Francesco Sforza was so enraged at his death that he blocked his daughter's wedding procession, threatening to cancel the wedding. The situation was finally resolved and Ippolita, after staying for two months in Siena and then having passed through Rome, reached Naples on September 14, where with great magnificence she was received by Alfonso her husband and her father-in-law Ferrante, who set up many parties and shows to celebrate the wedding.

In the early days relations with her husband, three years younger than her, had to be good, if in that same year the fifteen-year-old Eleonora of Aragon, in turn about to marry Ippolita's younger brother, Sforza Maria Sforza, desired "even some of the carezone [which] she sees do no time from the Duke of Calabria to the duchess", and if Ippolita herself writes to her mother that she and Alfonso slept together every night and that they often had fun between hunts and tickling in country residences. In these terms she describes her husband, for example, in one of the many letters: "My Ill.mo consort [...] et con caccia di falconi et nebbii et con giugare al ballone et con leggere et interpretarme uno suo libro spagnuolo de regimento de stato et molte altre cose morale, me ha tenuto et tene in great pleasure". 

If so, then the relations between the spouses had to deteriorate later over time, both for the continuous and brazen betrayals of Alfonso, who would have found a new and complacent lover in Trogia Gazzella, and for the bad character that distinguished him. In fact, already a few weeks after the wedding we have news of the first jealousies of Ippolita towards her spouse: Alfonso is described by ladies and ambassadors as a very beautiful young man, "so pretty you couldn't tell", but "so much alive that he could not sit still for half an hour". 

Even Alfonso, however, was jealous of his wife: in the summer of 1466 he did not want Ippolita to play with Giovanna Sanseverino anymore when she went to visit her accompanied by her relative Gian Francesco.

Starting from December 1466 some letters from both the ambassadors and the person directly concerned report an episode of jealousy on the part of Ippolita, at that time pregnant with the firstborn, who had commissioned her own servant, Donato, to stalk her husband wherever he went. Alfonso therefore, realizing that he was being followed, had reacted with a reckless gesture towards Donato that we are not given to know (Ambassador Pietro Landriani speaks of beatings), but which nevertheless must have been very serious if Ippolita shows herself very saddened, writing to her mother: "this thing of Donato that I will never forget [...] not a wound to the core, but I think if it opened by means so much it was my pain et serà".

King Ferrante minimized the incident with the Milanese relatives, saying that "these wars of the day have peace in the evening", but the situation did not improve even with the announcement of the first pregnancy of the duchess.

Alfonso's violent reaction should not be surprising: he was not by chance hated by the Neapolitan people for having offended his subjects with "cruel insults et iniurie", for having been guilty of the most nefarious crimes, such as "violar virgine, taking for his dilecto the women of others" and for practicing the "vitio detestando et abominevole de la sodomia", he was therefore only beginning to manifest his real character to his wife. Nevertheless, Ippolita as a wife always remained faithful to him, in fact she "distinguished herself for her high fidelity to her fearsome husband and for her unheard of modesty". King Ferrante, on the other hand, showed himself to be very satisfied with his daughter-in-law for her beauty, intelligence and custom, to such an extent that the Sforza ambassadors wrote that "the Majesty of the king has no other pleasure, nor any other paradise he does not seem to find, except when he sees her dancing and even singing". From the letters to the mother there is a certain discomfort for the perhaps excessive demonstrations of affection of the father-in-law, but it is to be considered that Ippolita was in Naples for a short time and that the very spontaneous character of King Ferrante could easily be misunderstood.

She also formed excellent friendships with her brother-in-law Federico, like her lover of letters and a man with a very sensitive soul, who very often went to visit her in Castel Capuano or in the villa called della Duchesca staying in his company.

Throughout her life Ippolita found herself playing the role of peacemaker between Milan and Naples and between Naples and Florence, as relations between the various powers were strained and Ferrante was partly responsible for the famous Pazzi conspiracy. In fact, in 1480 when Lorenzo de' Medici went, not without some fear, to Naples to try to mediate a peace with Ferrante, he did not leave Florence before being reassured by Ippolita that Ferrante would not imprison and kill him as he used to do with guests.

Already in 1468 Ippolita had returned to the court of Milan to try to pacify her brother Galeazzo Maria, who became duke after the death of his father, with their mother Bianca Maria and also with his father-in-law Ferrante. However, the visit turned out to be very short, as Ippolita, at the time in the midst of her beauty as a woman, was forced to return quickly to Naples to escape, it seems, the flattery of her brother, who showed very ambiguous feelings towards her. 

As a mother she was very fond of her children, and this is demonstrated by the tender letter she wrote to her mother to announce the birth of the firstborn Ferrandino, in which she hopes that her little son, growing up, will show her the same affection that she still showed to her mother. In addition to the three children had by Alfonso, Ippolita also raised as her own two grandchildren, Beatrice and Ferrante d'Este, children of her sister-in-law Eleonora d'Aragona, who had left them still children at the court of Naples by the will of their father Ferrante.

Death 
Ippolita died suddenly on August 19, 1488 in Castel Capuano, shortly before the wedding of her daughter Isabella, according to Arienti due to an "apostema in the head". 

Her death was prophesied by Friar Francis of Aragon, who was in the city of Florence: from there the friar wrote to the duchess, who recommended her to pray for the soul of her mother, having had a vision in which the deceased Bianca Maria Visconti told him that she had begged God to let his daughter enter heaven with her, adding that by now the bread was baked and that the Almighty was eager to taste it at his own convito. Two or three days after receiving the letter, Ippolita was seriously ill and sixteen days later died, despite all the processions and relics - such as the blood of St. Januarius, the crucifix to which St. Thomas Aquinas spoke and the head of St. Luke the Evangelist - brought to her bedside. 

Her family members were always close to her, including the king and queen, and so also the eldest son Ferrandino who, initially very far from home, as soon as he received news of his mother's illness immediately returned to comfort her, being loved by the latter maximally. The second son Peter was instead sick in bed and on the verge of death, and for this reason the departure of his mother was kept secret from him, so as not to cause him a displeasure that could have killed him. 

Great funerals were made and the deceased, dressed in white brocade, with a golden circle on her head and jewels and rings on her fingers, was buried in the church of theAnnunziata in Naples.

She composed many letters. These have been published in Italy in a single volume entitled, The Letters of Ippolita Maria Sforza, and edited by Serena Castaldo. Previously, in 1893, in Bologna, F. Gabotto published a collection of Ippolita's letters which she had written in Naples from 1475 to 1482.

Apart from epistolary activity, her notable writings include poetry and a Latin eulogy for her father Francesco.

Religious fervor 
Ippolita died in the smell of holiness because of the deeply religious conduct she had kept alive: every day she listened to three masses, sometimes even four or five, in any case no less than two. So she recited the rosary daily and read a prayer book as big as a psalter and one as big as a vesperal, kneeling before the image of the Virgin. She also recited seven penitential psalms and prayers in suffrage for her deceased parents and relatives, maintaining this habit for more than twenty years. 

All the vigils of the Immaculate recited a thousand hail marys to honor the Virgin, to whom she always turned her thoughts, and very often she wept thinking of her sufferings. Every Saturday she recited the rosary three times with great devotion, having been the one who brought this litany from Lombardy to Naples, and all the vigils of the Immaculate recited it six times. On Friday morning she used to enter the chapel before Mass and, left alone, she closed the door, then prayed prostrate on the floor with her arms on the cross to remember the passion of Christ, saying a hundred paternostri and a hundred hail marys. Then she opened the doors and let in the chaplains who were to celebrate Mass. Every day she also wanted to hear the prayers of vespers. 

Her soul was not satisfied by so many prayers, so that she also made other people pray: when the house of Aragon was in a state of serious calamity, in her house she prayed uninterruptedly: her women were ready two by two, in strict order, kneeling before the crucifix, then giving themselves the change, often continuing so day and night. The candles before the images of Christ and the Virgin were to remain by her will always lit until she had obtained the required grace.

While her husband risked his life in Otranto, fighting for the liberation of the city from the Turks, Ippolita spent the nights kneeling in prayer in front of the altar; once she stayed there nine consecutive hours, other times six or seven, depending on the need she felt at that moment, and her knees were wounded to the bone. When her loved ones were sick, she, in addition to endless prayers, also organized processions and pilgrimages, always obtaining their grace. Once her eldest son Ferrandino was reduced to the end of life, with no hope of healing, so that Ippolita, followed by a multitude of naked children, up to a thousand, and by numerous praying virgins, several days walked the streets of Naples barefoot to invite the people to pray for her son, then - always barefoot - went to Sorrento through an impervious mountain, traveling more than thirty miles, and finally obtained that Ferrandino was healed. After this feat her feet needed to be medicated for several days because of the sores caused by the long journey. 

As soon as a vow was fulfilled, she immediately wanted to fulfill her promises: she fasted, fed the poor, or called masses, then repeated the commitment in suffrage of the souls of her parents. 

These facts are all told to us by Fra' Bernardino da Rende, who often celebrated Masses for her, while Giovanni Sabadino degli Arienti even tells of miraculous events: it happened one day that her son Ferrandino, at the time about twenty years old, "for grandeza et prestantia de animo, tormenting a gallant horse, that falls on them, so that he was raised believing himself dead spindle". The young prince then remained in a coma for thirteen days, until his mother Ippolita, weeping and devoutly invoking the help of the Virgin with endless prayers, obtained that "lost them, or lost lost spirits restored in the former body of the son". 

In similar ways she had also obtained the healings of her other two children, Isabella and Pietro, also reduced to serious condition, as well as her husband Alfonso and father-in-law Ferrante. 

As for almsgiving, every day she gave more than thirty poor people meat, bread and wine, and increased them to another nineteen on the eve of the Immaculate Conception and on all the feasts of his Protector. Once a month she visited all the prisoners to console them and used to send the court doctors to the poor sick out of pity. She made numerous donations to monasteries and provided dowry to poor girls who were ashamed to beg. All these benefits she wanted to be done as secretly as possible, so that the praise in this life would not take away that of the other, nevertheless they were made known at her death by the people who were close to her. She never wanted to be thanked for what she did, nor could she bear to be praised. 

She had a particular devotion to the observant orders, which is why she wore the rope of Friar Minor around her shirt. She fasted during the four canonical times and their vigils, and with great sacrifice also for the whole of Lent, as well as punctually every Saturday. Every evening he aned the foreheads of her children with holy oil, drawing the sign of the cross, and blessed them with love before sending them to bed, then repeated the same operation in the morning. 

Even in the course of the illness that led her to the tomb, Ippolita did not disturb or upset, but remained persevering in her virtue. On her last day of life, feeling that she was about to die, she asked to be able to listen to a mass of the angels, to go with them accompanied. Her relatives were estranged by this request, since the duchess did not usually ask for such a mass, and asked her if she did not rather want a mass of the Nunciata, but Ippolita remained firm in her initial purpose. All this happened on a Tuesday, which is the day proper to the angels and which also in that year occurred with the feast of the Nunziata, to which the duchess was deeply devoted.

Lineage 
The marriage with Alfonso produced three children:

 Ferdinand II of Naples known as "Ferrandino" (26 June 1467 - 7 October 1496), King of Naples from 1495 to 1496;
 Isabella (2 October 1470 – 11 February 1524), Duchess of Milan by marriage to her cousin Gian Galeazzo Sforza and later Duchess of Bari. She was the mother of Bona Sforza of Aragon, wife of Sigismund I of Poland;
 Pietro (31 March 1472 - 17 February 1491), Prince of Rossano.

In mass culture

Literature 
The Trattato della laudanda vita e della profetata morte di Ippolita Sforza d'Aragona by Bernardino da Rende is dedicated to her.

Television 

 In the Netflix series Medici Ippolita is played by the French actress Gaia Weiss.
 In the historical fantasy drama series Da Vinci's Demons Ippolita is played by Jeany Spark.

In both television series, however, the character of Ippolita appears totally distorted, as she never nurtured towards Lorenzo de' Medici, with whom she entertained an exchange of letters, other than a sincere friendship, which was never love, nor therefore Ippolita, as a woman famous for her singular modesty, would never have granted herself to him thus betraying her husband, nor King Ferrante, in love with his daughter-in-law, would have ever exploited her by pushing her to prostitute herself at the Medici.

References

Sources

15th-century Italian nobility
1446 births
1488 deaths
People from Cremona
15th-century Italian women writers
Ippolita Maria
Ippolita Maria
15th-century Italian writers
15th-century Italian women